Lu Wei may refer to:

Lu Wei (politician) (born 1960), Chinese politician
Lu Wei, director, winner of Golden Rooster Award for Best Directorial Debut
Lü Wei (footballer) (born 1989), Chinese footballer
Lü Wei (softball) (born 1983), Chinese softball player
Lü Wei (diver) (1966–1990), Chinese diver
Lu Wei (diver) (born 2005), Chinese diver
Lu Wei (scientist), winner of a 2018 Blavatnik Award